Chevelle Lynvette Hallback (born September 3, 1971) is a female boxer from Plant City, Florida.  Hallback, nicknamed "Fist of Steel", has been featured on television many times, usually fighting the biggest names in the sport. Hallback is among the most recognized female boxers in the world.

Career
Hallback began her professional boxing career on February 21, 1997, beating Connie Plosser by a first round knockout in Miami. 
In just her second fight, Hallback faced Lucia Rijker, who many considered the best pound-for-pound female boxer in the world at the time. Hallback was defeated by Rijker on March 22, losing by a fifth round technical knockout. Although she lost the fight, Hallback gave Rijker some trouble before Rijker's experience and conditioning edge took over.

After two consecutive wins, she fought for her first world title, and, on February 6, 1998, she became the WIBF's world Featherweight champion by knocking out Bonnie Canino in seven rounds.

In 1999, she only had one fight, which resulted in a non-title defense win. She challenged for her second world title, the IFBA world Jr. Lightweight title, when she faced Doris Hackl on April 26, 2000 in Kenner, Louisiana. Hallback failed to win the title by dropping a ten round majority decision to Hackl. Many people who saw that fight, including the TV commentators, thought Hallback did enough to win the fight.
Her next fight was also very important, as she faced Laura Serrano on July 8, 2001 in Las Vegas, Nevada. Despite having been out of the ring for fifteen months before this fight, Hallback lost a six round majority decision to the Mexican fighter.

Four months later, on November 16, she fought for the WIBA world Jr. Lightweight title, in Austin, Texas, against Snodene Blakeney but had to settle for a 2nd round technical draw when Blakeney was accidentally cut by a headbutt. This was followed by two back to back wins over Brenda Drexel.

After two more wins, including a fourth round knockout of Drexel in their third bout, she challenged Alicia Ashley for the IBA world Jr. Lightweight title, on August 27, 2002, at Savannah, Georgia. Hallback outpointed Ashley over ten rounds.

Her next three bouts were non title affairs, and Hallback won each of them in two rounds or less.

She would have defended her IBA world Jr. Lightweight title for the first time on December 28, 2002, against Layla McCarter in Savannah. McCarter, however, suffered an injury during training one week prior to the fight. The promoters could not find an opponent, and McCarter decided to go on with the fight as scheduled, but the IBA decided it would be another non-title fight. Hallback won by a ten round unanimous decision.

Next, Hallback faced the ex-welterweight champ Mitzi Jeter twice in a row, beating her each time by six round unanimous decisions. On May 31, 2003, she met Britt Van Buskirk, winning by a six round decision, and Brenda Drexel for a fourth time, defeating Drexel by a six round decision.

Her next fight, against Melissa Del Valle, was a long-awaited match-up. Hallback retained the IBA Jr. Lightweight title with a ten round unanimous decision on August 30, and she followed that victory with a first round knockout win over Michelle Ewing.

Her luck ran out, however, when she moved up 10 pounds and 2 weight classes to meet Mary Jo Sanders on May 20, 2004, for the IBA continental Jr. Welterweight title, when she lost a ten round decision to the much bigger Sanders.

Hallback returned to 130 pounds, and back to her winning ways June 4, when she was rematched with Canino, in Oregon. Hallback won by a fourth round knockout.

Her next fight was another rematch, as she was finally able to defend her IBA Jr. Lightweight title against McCarter, on July 2, at San Diego, California. Hallback retained the title by a ten round unanimous decision.

Hallback then travelled to Tokyo Japan, and on March 13, 2005, she beat Emiko Raika by 10 round unanimous decision to win the WIBA Super Featherweight World Title.

On November 18, 2005, in Edmonton Alberta Canada, Hallback won a 10-round unanimous decision over Belinda Laracuente, defending her WIBA title.

On 7 May 2011, she will face the undefeated Norwegian boxer, Cecilia Brækhus, in Copenhagen.

Professional boxing record

|-
| style="text-align:center;" colspan="8"|32 Wins (13 knockouts, 20 decisions), 8 Losses, 2 Draws
|-  style="text-align:center; background:#e3e3e3;"
|  style="border-style:none none solid solid; "|Res.
|  style="border-style:none none solid solid; "|Record
|  style="border-style:none none solid solid; width:175px; "|Opponent
|  style="border-style:none none solid solid; "|Type
|  style="border-style:none none solid solid; "|Rd., Time
|  style="border-style:none none solid solid; "|Date
|  style="border-style:none none solid solid; "|Location
|  style="border-style:none none solid solid; "|Notes
|- align=center
|Win
|32–8–2
|align=left| Szilvia Szabados
|Decision (unanimous) || 6
|2019-11-02 || align=left| 
|
|- align=center
|Win
|31–8–2
|align=left| Szilvia Szabados
|Decision (unanimous) || 6
|2019-09-21 || align=left| 
|
|- align=center
|Win
|30–8–2
|align=left| Victoria Cisneros
|TKO || 8 (10)
|2014-08-22 || align=left| 
|vacant WBF World Female Welterweight Title
|- align=center
|Win
|29–8–2
|align=left| Dominga Olivo
|TKO || 2 (6)
|2014-06-13 || align=left| 
|
|- align=center
|Loss
|28–8–2
|align=left| Myriam Lamare
|Decision (unanimous) || 10
|2011-11-05 || align=left| 
|vacant IBF World Female Super Lightweight Title
|- align=center
|Loss
|28–7–2
|align=left| Cecilia Brækhus
|Decision (unanimous) || 10
|2011-05-07 || align=left| 
|WBA, WBC & WBO Welterweight Title
|- align=center
|Win
|28–6–2
|align=left| Victoria Cisneros
|Decision (split) || 8
|2010–12-03 || align=left| 
|
|- align=center
|Loss
|27–6–2
|align=left| Holly Holm
|Decision (unanimous) || 10
|2010-03–26 || align=left| 
|
|- align=center
|Win
|27–5–2
|align=left| Jeannine Garside
|Decision (split) || 10
|2008-06–13 || align=left| 
|vacant WBAN World Lightweight & vacant IFBA World Lightweight Titles
|- align=center
|
|26–5–2
|align=left| Melissa Hernández
|Points || 10
|2008-02-07 || align=left| 
|
|- align=center
|Win
|26–5–1
|align=left| Terri Blair
|Decision (unanimous) || 8
|2007-07-02 || align=left| 
|
|- align=center
|Loss
|25–5–1
|align=left| Holly Holm
|Decision (unanimous) || 10
|2007-05–23 || align=left| 
|
|- align=center
|Win
|25–4–1
|align=left| Belinda Laracuente
|Decision (unanimous) || 10
|2005–11–18 || align=left| 
|WIBA Super Featherweight Title
|- align=center
|
|24–4–1
|align=left| Melissa Del Valle
|No decision || 3
|2005-10–07 || align=left| 
|
|- align=center
|Win
|24–4–1
|align=left| Emiko Raika
|Decision (unanimous) || 10
|2005–03–13 || align=left| 
|WIBA Super Featherweight Title
|- align=center
|Win
|23–4–1
|align=left| Kim Colbert
|TKO || 2
|2005-01–26 || align=left| 
|
|- align=center
|Win
|22–4–1
|align=left| Layla McCarter
|Decision (unanimous) || 10
|2004-07-02 || align=left| 
|WIBA Super Featherweight Title
|- align=center
|Win
|21–4–1
|align=left| Bonnie Canino
|TKO || 4
|2004-06–04 || align=left| 
|
|- align=center
|Loss
|20–4–1
|align=left| Mary Jo Sanders
|Points || 10
|2004-05–20 || align=left| 
|- align=center
|Win
|20–3–1
|align=left| Michelle Ewing
|TKO || 1
|2003-09–20 || align=left| 
|
|- align=center
|Win
|19–3–1
|align=left| Melissa Del Valle
|Decision (unanimous) || 10
|2003-08–30 || align=left| 
|IBA Super Featherweight Title
|- align=center
|Win
|18–3–1
|align=left| Brenda Drexel
|Decision (unanimous) || 6
|2003-06–28 || align=left| 
|
|- align=center
|Win
|17–3–1
|align=left| Britt Van Buskirk
|Decision (unanimous) || 6
|2003-05–31 || align=left| 
|
|- align=center
|Win
|16–3–1
|align=left| Mitzi Jeter
|Decision (unanimous) || 6
|2003-04–26 || align=left| 
|
|- align=center
|Win
|15–3–1
|align=left| Mitzi Jeter
|Decision (unanimous) || 6
|2003-03–29 || align=left| 
|
|- align=center
|Win
|14–3–1
|align=left| Layla McCarter
|Decision (unanimous) || 10
|2002-12–28 || align=left| 
|
|- align=center
|Win
|13–3–1
|align=left| Willicia Moorehead
|KO || 1
|2002-11–22 || align=left| 
|
|- align=center
|Win
|12–3–1
|align=left| Vicky Clardy
|KO || 1
|2002-10–20 || align=left| 
|
|- align=center
|Win
|11–3–1
|align=left| Vanessa Pine
|KO || 2
|2002-09–27 || align=left| 
|
|- align=center
|Win
|10–3–1
|align=left| Alicia Ashley
|Decision (unanimous) || 10
|2002-08–27 || align=left| 
|IBA Super Featherweight Title
|- align=center
|Win
|9–3–1
|align=left| Brenda Drexel
|TKO || 4
|2002-06–29 || align=left| 
|
|- align=center
|Win
|8–3–1
|align=left| Carla Witherspoon
|Decision (unanimous) || 6
|2002-06–04 || align=left| 
|
|- align=center
|Win
|7–3–1
|align=left| Brenda Drexel
|Decision (unanimous) || 6
|2002-04–27 || align=left| 
|
|- align=center
|Win
|6–3–1
|align=left| Brenda Drexel
|Decision (unanimous) || 6
|2002-03–22 || align=left| 
|
|- align=center
|
|5–3–1
|align=left| Snodene Blakeney
|Decision (technical) || 3
|2001-11–16 || align=left| 
|WIBA Super Featherweight Title
|- align=center
|Loss
|5–3
|align=left| Laura Serrano
|Decision (majority) || 6
|2001-07–08 || align=left| 
|
|- align=center
|Loss
|5–2
|align=left| Doris Hackl
|Decision (majority) || 10
|2000-04–26 || align=left| 
|IFBA Super Featherweight Title
|- align=center
|Win
|5–1
|align=left| Hayde Nuñez
|Decision (unanimous) || 4
|1999-06–11 || align=left| 
|
|- align=center
|Win
|4–1
|align=left| Bonnie Canino
|TKO || 7
|1998-03–06 || align=left| 
|WIBF Featherweight Title
|- align=center
|Win
|3–1
|align=left| Bethany Payne
|TKO || 1
|1997-09–20 || align=left| 
|
|- align=center
|Win
|2–1
|align=left| Judy Mayrand
|TKO || 1
|1997-05–21 || align=left| 
|
|- align=center
|Loss
|1–1
|align=left| Lucia Rijker
|TKO || 5
|1997-03–22 || align=left| 
|
|- align=center
|Win
|1-0
|align=left| Connie Plosser
|TKO || 1
|1997-02–21 || align=left| 
|

Mixed martial arts record

|-
| Loss
| align=center| 1–1
| Sarah Wilson
| Submission (triangle choke)
| XFC 7
| 
| align=center|1
| align=center|3:03
| Knoxville, Tennessee, United States
|
|-
| Win
| align=center| 1–0
| Melissa Vasquez
| TKO (punches)
| XFC 6
| 
| align=center|1
| align=center|0:41
| Tampa, Florida, United States
|
|-
|}

References

External links

1971 births
Living people
Mixed martial artists from Florida
American women boxers
Boxers from Florida
People from Plant City, Florida
Welterweight boxers
American female mixed martial artists
Mixed martial artists utilizing boxing
21st-century American women